DeKalb High School is a public high school in Waterloo, Indiana.  Established in 1967, it is part of the DeKalb Central United School District.  The school is just south of Waterloo, but the majority of its students come from the Auburn area. It shares a campus with DeKalb Middle School and the School District's Office.

Athletics 
The Dekalb Barons compete in the Northeast Eight Conference. The school colors are red, black and white.  The following Indiana High School Athletic Association (IHSAA) sanctioned sports are offered:

Baseball (boys)
State champion - 1980
Basketball (girls and boys)
Cross country (girls and boys)
Football (boys)
State champion - 1986
Unified flag football (coed) 
State champion - 2021
Golf (girls and boys)
Gymnastics (girls)
Soccer (girls and boys) 
Softball (girls) 
Swim and dive (girls and boys) 
Tennis (girls and boys) 
Track and field (girls and boys) 
Unified track and field (coed) 
Volleyball (girls) 
Wrestling (boys)

Performing arts 
DHS has two competitive show choirs, the mixed "Classic Connection" and the women-only "Sound Sensation". The school formerly had a men's group, named "Skinny Bois".

Notable alumni 
Jarrett Grube, Major League Baseball (MLB) pitcher 
MaChelle Joseph, college basketball coach

See also
 List of high schools in Indiana

References

External links

Public high schools in Indiana
Educational institutions established in 1967
Schools in DeKalb County, Indiana
1967 establishments in Indiana